The 1952–53 Scottish Districts season is a record of all the  rugby union matches for Scotland's district teams.

It includes the Inter-City fixture between Glasgow District and Edinburgh District.

History

From the Inter-City match, it is noted that W. L. K. Cowie, Mackenzie, Blackwood improved their selection chances for the national team; and G. Culver also played well.

Results

Inter-City

Glasgow District: 

Edinburgh District:

Other Scottish matches

Glasgow District: 

Rest of West: 

South: 

Edinburgh District: 

North: 

Midlands: 

North: 

South:

English matches

South: 

Durham County:

International matches

No touring matches this season.

References

1952–53 in Scottish rugby union
Scottish Districts seasons